Carboxypeptidase C (carboxypeptidase Y, serine carboxypeptidase I, cathepsin A, lysosomal protective protein, deamidase, lysosomal carboxypeptidase A, phaseolin) is an enzyme. This enzyme catalyses the following chemical reaction

 Release of a C-terminal amino acid with broad specificity

This enzyme is a carboxypeptidase with optimum activity at pH 4.5-6.0. It is inhibited by diisopropyl fluorophosphate.

See also 
 Cathepsin A

References

External links 
 

EC 3.4.16